Nothing More is a 2001 Cuban comedy film directed by Juan Carlos Cremata Malberti. It was selected as the Cuban entry for the Best Foreign Language Film at the 75th Academy Awards, but it was not nominated.

Cast
 Thais Valdés as Carla Pérez
 Nacho Lugo as Cesar
 Daisy Granados as Cunda
 Paula Ali as Cuca

See also
 List of submissions to the 75th Academy Awards for Best Foreign Language Film
 List of Cuban submissions for the Academy Award for Best Foreign Language Film

References

External links
 

2001 films
2001 comedy films
Cuban comedy films
2000s Spanish-language films